G Ring  may refer to:
 Rings of Saturn#G Ring, a planetary ring system around Saturn.
 G-ring or Grothendieck ring, a type of commutative ring in algebra